Brahim Toughza (born 1951) is a Moroccan wrestler. He competed in the men's Greco-Roman 74 kg at the 1976 Summer Olympics.

References

1951 births
Living people
Moroccan male sport wrestlers
Olympic wrestlers of Morocco
Wrestlers at the 1976 Summer Olympics
Place of birth missing (living people)
20th-century Moroccan people